Dominique Van Roost was the defending champion but lost in the quarterfinals to Rita Grande.

Virginia Ruano-Pascual won in the final 6–1, 3–6, 6–2 against Alexia Dechaume-Balleret.

Seeds
A champion seed is indicated in bold text while text in italics indicates the round in which that seed was eliminated.

  Dominique Van Roost (quarterfinals)
  Åsa Carlsson (quarterfinals)
  Miriam Oremans (second round)
  Petra Langrová (quarterfinals)
  Sarah Pitkowski (semifinals)
  Annabel Ellwood (first round)
  Denisa Chládková (first round)
  Yuka Yoshida (first round)

Draw

External links
 1997 Welsh International Open Draw

1997 Welsh International Open
1997 WTA Tour